William Laurence Ormrod (September 8, 1863 – September 3, 1921) was an American businessman, farmer and politician from New York.

Life
William L. Ormrod was born in Cleveland, Ohio on September 8, 1863, the son of William Ormrod and Catherine Ormrod. He attended the public schools, and business college, in Cleveland. Then he worked as a hotel telegraph operator, as a hotel clerk, and eventually as a hotel manager. For about ten years he managed the Hotel Royal in New Orleans during the winter season, and the Clifton House in Niagara Falls, New York, during the summer season. Then he became a partner in the Monmouth House in Spring Lake, New Jersey, then the largest beach resort on the Atlantic coast.

On October 23, 1899, he married Harriet E. Brooks, retired from the hotel business, went to live in Rochester, New York, and in 1905 bought a large estate in nearby Churchville, New York, his wife's home village. There he became a large stockholder in the Flour City National Bank; engaged in the construction of infrastructure, like telephone, electricity, roads and bridges; and also engaged in farming on his 200-acres estate. He was the town supervisor of the Town of Riga, New York, in 1905.

Ormrod was a member of the New York State Senate (46th D.) from 1911 to 1914, sitting in the 134th, 135th, 136th and 137th New York State Legislatures.

He died on September 3, 1921, at his home near Churchville, New York, and was buried at the Mount Hope Cemetery in Rochester.

References

 Official New York from Cleveland to Hughes by Charles Elliott Fitch (Hurd Publishing Co., New York and Buffalo, 1911, Vol. IV; pg. 367)
  History of Rochester and Monroe County, New York: from the earliest historic times to the beginning of 1907 (Volume 2) by William Farley Peck

External links

1863 births
1921 deaths
Republican Party New York (state) state senators
Businesspeople from Rochester, New York
Politicians from Cleveland
Politicians from Rochester, New York